The Three Musketeers (French: Les trois mousquetaires) is a 1959 French TV film based on a play adaptation of the 1844 novel by Alexandre Dumas. It is notable for featuring Jean Paul Belmondo in the lead.

It was directed by Claude Barma and was broadcast live on Christmas Day.

Cast
Jean-Paul Belmondo as D'Artagnan
Pierre Asso as Cardinal Richelieu
Jean Chevrier as Athos
Georges Descrières as DeWinter
Bernard Dhéran as Buckingham
Daniel Sorano as Porthos
Gaby Sylvia as Milady

Production
Belmondo was cast on the basis of his success in the play Oscar. He did not make another film for TV until 2001.

References

External links

Clip from film at YouTube

1959 films
Films based on The Three Musketeers
Television shows based on The Three Musketeers
French television films
Cultural depictions of Cardinal Richelieu
Films directed by Claude Barma
1950s French films